Billion cubic meters of natural gas (abbreviated: bcm) or cubic kilometer of natural gas is a measure of natural gas production and trade. Some definitions cite volume, others energy content.

Dependant of implied standards, this measure may represent different value of energy content.

Volume based definitions
That means that 1 billion cubic metres of natural gas by the International Energy Agency standard is equivalent to 1.017 billion cubic metres of natural gas by the Russian standard.

Energy based definitions
Some other organizations use energy equivalent-based standards.

References

Natural gas
Units of volume
Units of energy
Non-SI metric units
International Energy Agency
BP